Nikolai Talts (26 November 1890 Laiksaare Parish, Pärnu County – 26 January 1949 Tallinn) was an Estonian lawyer and politician. He was a member of Estonian Constituent Assembly.

1933–1938 he was Minister of Agriculture.

References

1890 births
1949 deaths
20th-century Estonian lawyers
Estonian Labour Party politicians
Members of the Estonian National Assembly
Members of the Estonian Constituent Assembly
Agriculture ministers of Estonia
Prisoners and detainees of the Soviet Union
Gulag detainees
People from Saarde Parish